The men's large hill individual ski jumping competition for the 1976 Winter Olympics was held in Bergiselschanze. It occurred on 15 February.

Results

References

Ski jumping at the 1976 Winter Olympics